Adrien Costa (born August 19, 1997) is an American former cyclist, who rode professionally for UCI Professional Continental team  in 2016 and 2017.

Career

Junior career
Costa had a very successful career as a junior, with over 12 victories. In 2014, he won the junior national time trial championships, along with a second place at the junior world time trial championships. In addition to these, he won the general classification and two stages of the Tour du Pays de Vaud. The following year, Costa won the Tour du Pays de Vaud for the second year in a row, along with another silver medal at the junior world time trial championships. He enjoyed success in the Tour de l'Abitibi, winning the GC and earning two stage victories. The previous year, Costa had placed 7th overall at the race, winning stage 3. Costa booked yet another win at the Course de la Paix Juniors, when he won stage 3.

2016
Costa's cycling success continued in the 2016 season as his first year as a professional when he earned his biggest result yet, when he won the Tour de Bretagne. Costa was the first American to win the French stage race. He stole the yellow jersey when he won the fourth stage in a solo breakaway. Costa celebrated success in other similar events, winning the mountains classification placing 3rd overall in the Rhône-Alpes Isère Tour. He also placed 5th in Le Triptyque des Monts et Châteaux. At the Tour of Utah, Costa finished 2nd overall, 1:09 behind winner Lachlan Morton. He earned another podium in the Tour de l'Avenir, finishing in 3rd place and won stage 4.

Costa last raced professionally in April 2017, before taking a break from July 2017 and subsequently opting out of his contract with Hagens Berman Axeon for 2018. Costa was reported to be studying outdoor leadership and tourism at Oregon State University.

Rock climbing incident
On July 29, 2018, Costa was severely injured in a rock climbing accident, resulting in an above-the-knee amputation of his right leg.

Major results

2014
 1st  Time trial, National Junior Road Championships
 1st  Overall Tour du Pays de Vaud
1st Young rider classification
1st Stages 2 & 3 (ITT)
 2nd  Time trial, UCI Junior Road World Championships
 7th Overall Tour de l'Abitibi
1st Stage 3 (ITT)
2015
 1st  Overall Tour de l'Abitibi
1st Points classification
1st Stages 6 & 7
 1st  Overall Tour du Pays de Vaud
1st Stages 2a & 2b (ITT)
 2nd  Time trial, UCI Junior Road World Championships
 2nd Time trial, National Junior Road Championships
 2nd Overall Course de la Paix Juniors
1st Mountains classification
1st Stage 3
 3rd Overall Redlands Bicycle Classic
 10th Overall Trofeo Karlsberg
2016
 1st  Overall Tour de Bretagne
1st  Young rider classification
1st Stage 4
 1st Stage 4 (ITT) Tour de Savoie Mont-Blanc
 2nd Overall Tour of Utah
1st  Mountains classification
1st  Young rider classification
 3rd Overall Tour de l'Avenir
1st Stage 4 (ITT)
 3rd Overall Rhône-Alpes Isère Tour
1st  Mountains classification
 5th Overall Le Triptyque des Monts et Châteaux
1st  Young rider classification
 7th Ronde van Vlaanderen Beloften
 9th Flèche Ardennaise
2017
 5th Giro del Belvedere

References

External links

 
 
 

1997 births
Living people
American male cyclists
People from Stanford, California